Harry Clayton Delamatre (August 8, 1888 – December 25, 1951) was an American football player and coach. He served as the head football coach at the University of Nebraska–Omaha–then known as the University of Omaha–from 1915 to 1916, compiling a record of 2–11–1.

Delamatre was a 1915 graduate of the University of Nebraska–Lincoln, where he was a letter-winner on the undefeated 1914 Nebraska Cornhuskers football team.

Head coaching record

References

External links
 

1888 births
1951 deaths
American football centers
American football fullbacks
Cornell Rams football players
Nebraska Cornhuskers football players
Nebraska–Omaha Mavericks football coaches
Sportspeople from Omaha, Nebraska
Players of American football from Nebraska